Hangover Square is a 1945 American film noir directed by John Brahm, based on the 1941 novel Hangover Square by Patrick Hamilton. The screenplay was written by Barré Lyndon, who made a number of changes to the novel, including transforming George Harvey Bone into a classical composer-pianist and filming the story as a turn-of-the-20th-century period piece.

The film, which stars Laird Cregar, Linda Darnell and George Sanders, was released in New York City on February 7, 1945, two months after Cregar suffered a fatal heart attack.

Plot
In Edwardian London in the summer of 1903, a Scottish shop owner in Fulham is stabbed to death and his shop set on fire by distinguished composer George Harvey Bone, who stumbles out onto the street in a stupor. George eventually makes his way back to his basement flat at 12 Hangover Square in Chelsea to find his girlfriend, Barbara Chapman, and her father,  Sir Henry Chapman, inside. George admits privately to Barbara that there is "a whole day missing" from his memory. The newspaper has stories of the murder and fire, and George goes to see Dr. Allan Middleton, who works at Scotland Yard. Bone tells Middleton that when he is stressed or overworked he suffers from periods of amnesia brought on by discordant sounds.

On August 29, at a smoking concert at a working-class pub, George meets ambitious and conniving singer Netta Longdon, through his buddy, Mickey. Although Netta, who also lives in the square, is a mediocre talent, George becomes enamored of her. Netta finds George boring, yet for months she mercilessly manipulates him to extract money, dinners, drinks and all kinds of favors. Meanwhile, Barbara is put off by George's interest in Netta, and Middleton tries to get closer to her. George is driven to another amnesia episode and almost strangles Barbara to death.

George finally kills Netta on Guy Fawkes Night. He carries her wrapped body through streets filled with revelers and deposits it on top of the largest bonfire. Having no memory of the killing, George is able to convince the police that he is innocent, but Middleton remains suspicious. He confronts George on the night of his concerto premiere and insists that he be taken in for his own protection. However, George locks Middleton in the flat and performs the concerto as planned. Middleton's banging is heard by a local workman, and he is freed. Midway through the performance, he enters the music salon with several other policemen, causing George to experience one of his episodes. He stops playing and asks Barbara to carry the performance; however, when police question him in a separate room, he attacks them. In the fracas, a gas lamp is knocked over, setting the building on fire. George goes back to playing the piano while the audience and musicians flee, unmindful of the fire around him and ignoring Barbara's pleas to escape. As Middleton, Barbara and Sir Henry look on from outside the burning building, Sir Henry asks why George didn't try to get out. Middleton replies, "It's better this way, Sir.” Cut to the concert hall, filling with flame and smoke, as George plays the last notes of his concerto.

Cast

 Laird Cregar as George Harvey Bone
 Linda Darnell as Netta Longdon
 George Sanders as Dr. Allan Middleton
 Glenn Langan as Eddie Carstairs
 Faye Marlowe as Barbara Chapman
 Alan Napier as Sir Henry Chapman

Uncredited:
 Michael Dyne as Mickey
 Frederick Worlock as Supt. Clay
 Clifford Brooke as Gas Company Watchman
 Ted Billings as Pub Patron

 Charles Coleman as Man at Bonfire
 Francis Ford as Ogilby
 Eric Wilton as Waiter
 John Goldsworthy as William - Chapman's Butler

Production
Laird Cregar, a fan of the original novel, encouraged 20th Century Fox to buy the film rights. Fox agreed, but wanted to recreate the success that it had enjoyed the previous year with The Lodger, and made several changes to the story, including the main character's personality and the setting. Cregar, George Sanders and John Brahm, who had all worked together in The Lodger, signed on with the project.

Cregar, who had ambitions of being a leading man and was worried that he would always be cast as a villain, refused the role and was put on suspension. Glenn Langan was announced as his replacement. However, Cregar realized that he could use his romantic scenes with Linda Darnell and Faye Marlowe to his advantage in order to change his public image into a more romantic one. He thus accepted the role, but began a radical crash diet to give his character more physical appeal.

The film had to be shot entirely in sequence so as to be consistent with Cregar's real-life weight loss. This frustrated director Brahm, who frequently clashed with Cregar. As a musician, Cregar was eager to perform the musical pieces on his own; however, Brahm insisted that he mime the piano playing. Cregar used amphetamines to aid his rapid weight loss, which led to erratic behavior. He lost patience with Cregar and forced the entire cast and crew to sign a document stating that they were on Brahm's side in order to humiliate Cregar into submission. When filming ended, Cregar told Brahm: "Well, I think we've worked together long enough to know we never want to work together again."

Sanders also brought complications. Having been placed on suspension the previous year for refusing to perform in The Undying Monster, he accepted the role of Dr. Allan Middleton. However, he was unhappy with his script, particularly the final line in the film, which required him to justify the death of George Harvey Bone by saying, "He's better off this way." When shooting the scene, which was very expensive to film, Sanders repeatedly refused to say the line. He was later involved in an altercation with the film's producer Robert Bassler, with Sanders punching Bassler. The line was later changed to "It's better this way."

The American composer Stephen Sondheim has cited Bernard Herrmann's score for Hangover Square as a major influence on his musical Sweeney Todd.

Reception
The film made a profit of $27,700.

The film received mixed reviews. The staff at Variety magazine liked the film and wrote, "Hangover Square is eerie murder melodrama of the London gaslight era—typical of Patrick Hamilton yarns, of which this is another. And it doesn't make any pretense at mystery. The madman-murderer is known from the first reel...Production is grade A, and so is the direction by John Brahm, with particular bows to the music score by Bernard Herrmann." The New York Times said: "There is not a first-class shiver in the whole picture."

CD release of Herrmann's music

In 2010, British label Chandos released a CD including a 17-minute concert suite from Hangover Square, assembled by Stephen Hogger. The film's musical tour de force is a sonata movement for piano and orchestra in the Lisztian style (in which the scherzo and adagio movements, which are typical as succeeding movements in a concerto, are compressed and presented in place of a central development). Slightly revised by the composer in 1973 for Charles Gerhardt's RCA film music series and retitled "Concerto Macabre," it has been recorded by RCA, Naïve, Koch and Naxos, in addition to the recording paired with Hogger's suite. Except for the RCA releases, all of the recordings of the concerto rely on a version edited in 1992 by Christopher Husted. The disc also includes Hogger's extended suite based on Herrmann's incidental music for Citizen Kane (1941).

References

External links
 
 
 
 
 Hangover Square information site and DVD review at DVD beaver (includes images)

Streaming audio
 Hangover Square on Hollywood Star Time: April 7, 1946

1945 films
1940s historical drama films
20th Century Fox films
American historical drama films
American black-and-white films
Film noir
Films about amnesia
Films based on British novels
Films directed by John Brahm
Films scored by Bernard Herrmann
Films set in 1899
Films set in London
1945 drama films
1940s English-language films
1940s American films